See That No One Else Escapes is the second album by Dave House (formerly of the band Lucky Thirteen). The album was originally released digitally and as a CD in the United Kingdom by Gravity DIP and later in the United States on vinyl by Runner Up Records. A music video was produced for the song "Medicine".

Track listing

Beep Beep (Hi, Hi)
Trafalgar Square To Anywhere
TV Song
All D's, No Future
Medicine
Carry You
For An Afternoon
Old Girl Back
The Scottish Coast
Shiver
See That No One Else Escapes

References

See also

Split album collaboration with Get Cape. Wear Cape. Fly

See That No One Else Escapes